The South Ballarat Football Club was an Australian rules football club which formerly competed in the Ballarat Football League.

The club was formed in the mid-1870s as the Albion Imperial Football Club before becoming known as South Ballarat in 1884. The club was a provincial member of the Victorian Football Association (VFA) from 1883 until 1896, taking part in the Association's administration and competing regularly against Melbourne-based VFA clubs.

The club was a founding member of the Ballarat Football Association in 1893. During its time in the competition, it won eight senior premierships, including three in a row between 1911 and 1913.

The club merged with the Sebastopol Football Club in 1940 to form the South Sebastopol Football Club. The club went into recess during World War II and did not return to competition after the war.

Ballarat Football League premierships (8): 1904, 1907, 1909, 1911, 1912, 1913, 1926, 1938

References

Ballarat Football League clubs
Former Victorian Football League clubs
Sport in Ballarat
1877 establishments in Australia
Australian rules football clubs established in 1877